Cecil Peter Baines (11 September 1919 – 1997) was an Australian-born footballer.

Baines played for a number of teams in the Football League Third Division North in the 1930s and 1940s.

References

1919 births
1997 deaths
Oldham Athletic A.F.C. players
Wrexham A.F.C. players
Crewe Alexandra F.C. players
Hartlepool United F.C. players
New Brighton A.F.C. players
English Football League players
Australian soccer players

Association football inside forwards
Australian expatriate sportspeople in England